Honoré Achim (August 2, 1881 – May 14, 1950) was a Canadian politician and lawyer. He was a member of the Conservative Party of Canada between November 15, 1911, and June 28, 1917, then crossed the floor to the Liberal Party of Canada, as a result of the conscription issue, where he remained until October 6, 1917.

Born in Montreal, Quebec, Achim also served as a Member of the Legislative Assembly of Quebec representing the Quebec Liberal Party in Labelle until resigning on October 13, 1921.

After his death in 1950, he was entombed at the Notre Dame des Neiges Cemetery in Montreal.

References
 
 
 Political history of Quebec - Honoré Achim

1881 births
1950 deaths
Conservative Party of Canada (1867–1942) MPs
Liberal Party of Canada MPs
Members of the House of Commons of Canada from Quebec
Politicians from Montreal
Lawyers from Montreal
Quebec Liberal Party MNAs
Burials at Notre Dame des Neiges Cemetery